Kristian Fredrik Malt Arnstad (born 7 September 2003) is a Norwegian professional footballer who plays as a midfielder for Anderlecht in the Belgian First Division A.

Professional career
A youth product of Heming, Arnstad signed with Anderlecht on 15 September 2019. Arnstad made his professional debut with Anderlecht in a 3-0 Belgian First Division A loss to Club Brugge KV on 4 October 2020.

References

External links
 
 Fotboll Profile
 

2003 births
Living people
Footballers from Oslo
Norwegian footballers
Norway youth international footballers
R.S.C. Anderlecht players
Belgian Pro League players
Association football midfielders
Norwegian expatriate footballers
Norwegian expatriates in Belgium
Expatriate footballers in Belgium
Norwegian expatriate sportspeople in Belgium